Émile Lucien Salkin (19 December 1900 – 27 August 1977) was a Belgian painter. His work was part of the painting event in the art competition at the 1936 Summer Olympics.

References

1900 births
1977 deaths
20th-century Belgian painters
Belgian painters
Olympic competitors in art competitions
People from Saint-Gilles, Belgium